77s or 77S may refer to:
 The 77s, American rock band
 Hobby Field in Creswell, Oregon, FAA identifier